The 1982–83 Eastern Counties Football League season was the 41st in the history of Eastern Counties Football League a football competition in England.

The league, called The Town & Country League was renamed back the Eastern Counties League.

League table

The league featured 22 clubs which competed in the league last season, no new clubs joined the league this season.

League table

References

External links
 Eastern Counties Football League

1982-83
1982–83 in English football leagues